Warp and Woof is the 28th album released by Guided by Voices, released on April 26, 2019.

Track listing 
All songs written by Robert Pollard, except where noted.
 "Bury the Mouse" – 1:30
 "Angelic Weirdness" – 1:33
 "Foreign Deputies" – 1:00
 "Dead Liquor Store" – 1:31
 "Mumbling Amens" – 1:55
 "Cohesive Scoops" – 1:31
 "Photo Range Within" – 1:15
 "My Dog Surprise" – 1:41
 "Tiny Apes" – 1:07
 "Blue Jay House" – 2:04
 "Down the Island" – 1:48
 "Thimble Society" – 1:44
 "My Angel" – 1:25
 "More Reduction Linda" – 1:36
 "Cool Jewels and Aprons" – 1:24
 "Even Next" – 1:39
 "It Will Never Be Simple" (Doug Gillard) – 2:31
 "The Stars Behind Us" – 1:22
 "Skull Arrow" – 1:03
 "Out of the Blue Race" – 1:21
 "Coming Back from Now On" – 1:53
 "The Pipers, the Vipers, the Snakes!" – 1:47
 "Time Remains in Central Position" – 1:49
 "End It with Light" – 1:10

Personnel
 Robert Pollard – vocals
 Doug Gillard – guitar
 Bobby Bare Jr. – guitar
 Mark Shue – bass guitar
 Kevin March – drums

References 

2019 albums
Guided by Voices albums